Assiut Airport  is an airport in Assiut (or Asyut), Egypt.

Airlines and destinations

See also 
List of airports in Egypt

References

External links
 
 

Airports in Egypt